The year 2001 is the 5th year in the history of the Pride Fighting Championships, a mixed martial arts promotion based in Japan. 2001 had 6 events beginning with, Pride 13 - Collision Course.

Title fights

Debut Pride FC fighters

The following fighters fought their first Pride FC fight in 2001:

 Alex Stiebling
 Antônio Rodrigo Nogueira
 Antonio Schembri
 Assuerio Silva
 Bobby Southworth
 Chuck Liddell
 Denis Sobolev
 Don Frye

 Jan Nortje
 Jeremy Horn
 Jose Landi
 Mario Sperry
 Matt Skelton
 Michiyoshi Ohara
 Mirko Cro Cop
 Murilo Rua
 Quinton Jackson

 Ricardo Arona
 Semmy Schilt
 Shungo Oyama
 Tadao Yasuda
 Valentijn Overeem
 Yoshihiro Takayama
 Yoshihisa Yamamoto
 Yuki Ishikawa

Events list

Pride 13: Collision Course

Pride 13: Collision Course was an event held on March 25, 2001 at the Saitama Super Arena in Saitama, Japan.

Results

Pride 14: Clash of the Titans

Pride 14: Clash of the Titans was an event held on May 27, 2001 at the Yokohama Arena in Yokohama, Japan.

Results

Pride 15: Raging Rumble

Pride 15: Raging Rumble was an event held on July 29, 2001 at the Saitama Super Arena Saitama Super Arena in Saitama, Japan. Future Pride and UFC legends Antônio Rodrigo Nogueira and Quinton Jackson made their Pride debuts at this event.

Results

Pride 16: Beasts from the East

Pride 16: Beasts from the East was an event held on September 24, 2001 at Osaka-jo Hall in Osaka, Japan.

Results

Pride 17: Championship Chaos

Pride 17: Championship Chaos was an event held on November 3, 2001 at the Tokyo Dome in Tokyo, Japan. This event saw the crowning of the first Pride FC Heavyweight and Middleweight champions. It also marked the debut of future Pride champion Mirko Cro Cop.

Results

Pride 18: Cold Fury 2

Pride 18: Cold Fury 2 was an event held on December 23, 2001 at the Marine Messe Fukuoka in Fukuoka, Japan.

Results

See also
 Pride Fighting Championships
 List of Pride Fighting Championships champions
 List of Pride Fighting events

References

Pride Fighting Championships events
2001 in mixed martial arts